Ferenc Stámusz (21 August 1934 – 27 August 2022) was a Hungarian cyclist. He competed at the 1960 Summer Olympics and the 1964 Summer Olympics. He won the Tour de Hongrie in 1964.

References

External links
 

1934 births
2022 deaths
Hungarian male cyclists
Olympic cyclists of Hungary
Cyclists at the 1960 Summer Olympics
Cyclists at the 1964 Summer Olympics
Cyclists from Budapest